Carniella weyersi is a species of comb-footed spider in the family Theridiidae. It is found in China and Sumatra.

The species was first described by Brignoli in 1979, placed with the genus Theone.

References

Theridiidae
Spiders described in 1979